Louise Christine Rasmussen, also known as Countess Danner (21 April 1815 – 6 March 1874), was a Danish ballet dancer and stage actor. She was the mistress and later the morganatic spouse of King Frederick VII of Denmark. She was not a queen consort, but officially styled Countess Danner.

Biography 
Louise Rasmussen was the daughter of the unmarried maid Juliane Caroline Rasmussen and the merchant Gotthilf L. Køppen.  She was a student of the ballet school of the Opera in Copenhagen in 1826, was contracted in 1830 and a figurante ballerina in 1835. In 1841, she had a child with the print maker Carl Berling, who was the heir of the paper Berlingske Tidende, one of the most important Danish newspapers. She retired from the ballet in 1842 and opened a fashion shop.

She got to know Crown Prince Frederick through Berling in the 1830s and had a relationship with him during the 1840s. Frederick became king in 1848. He wanted to marry Louise, but the government forbade it, as Frederick was childless and no children born from a marriage with Louise would have been entitled to the throne. The reformed law of 1849, however, made the king so popular that he was able to have his wish granted.

On 8 August 1850, Louise Rasmussen was given the title "Countess of Danner" and was married to Frederick in Frederiksborg Slotskirke by Bishop J. P. Mynster. She was the morganatic spouse of King Frederick, and was thereby not queen, nor did any possible children from the union have any right to the throne. The marriage was met with great dislike and opposition, especially from the upper-class and the nobility, who considered it a misalliance. Louise was met with humiliation and disdain in social circles.  On one occasion, for example, Frederick and Louise participated at a grand formal dinner with many members of the highest nobility; at the occasion in question, it was the custom of the nobility to propose a toast to the spouse of the monarch. This time, however, no one proposed a toast, even though Frederick and Louise waited for it to happen.   Eventually, Frederick lost his patience, stood up and said openly: "As no one here will propose a toast to my wife, I will do so myself!", after which the nobility finally raised their glasses. 

Louise was not regarded to be a member of high society nor to have any right to participate in it: she had never been a debutante or formally introduced at the royal court and high society in the way a noblewoman would normally be, and her presence was thereby basically considered to be incognito.  Frederick did attempt to have Louise formally introduced to high society.  He introduced her to his step-mother, queen dowager Caroline Amalie, by arranging a formal visit between them, and then demanded that the queen dowager's ladies-in-waiting return the visit to Louise, which was the normal process.  However, Caroline Amalie stated that she had accepted to receive Louise exclusively to be kind to the king and with the understanding that the visit should be unofficial, and that Louise could thereby not be regarded as formally introduced to society and remained a private person which her ladies-in-waiting had no obligation to visit: she reminded him that no officials had been present at his wedding because he himself had wished it to be an unofficial wedding, and should her ladies visit Louise, the whole matter would become official.  The letter from the queen dowager was seen as an insult and a rebuff to Louise and enraged Frederick, who refused to give a reply and let the matter drop. 

In 1854, the couple bought the manor, Jægerspris Slot, as a place to spend their private life, and after Frederick's death in 1863, Louise lived a discreet life there. In 1873, she founded "Frederick the VII:s Foundation for Poor Women from the Working Class", and the house was called "The Danner House". When she died, she left Jægerspris Slot "to the benefit of poor and destitute servant girls" in her last will and testament.

See also 

 Kirsten Munk

References

Further reading 
 Jægerspris Slot og Kong Frederik den syvendes Stiftelse af Roar Skovmand, 1974
 Stiftelsestøser - Kongebørn, af Lis Petersen, 1987
 Grevinde Danner - en oprørsk kvinde af Morten Meisner, 1990
 Grevinden af Bodil Wamberg, 2004
 Kvinderummet. Dannerhuset som kvindepolitisk forum og krisecenter af Britta M. Lindqvist, Kari Helene Partapuoli og Lea Holst Spenceley, 2004. Se også hjemmeside om bogen
 Louise længe leve - Maria Helleberg, 1994.

External links 

 Countess Danner at the website of the Royal Danish Collection at Rosenborg Castle

1815 births
1874 deaths
Danish ballerinas
Danish stage actresses
Mistresses of Danish royalty
Morganatic spouses
19th-century Danish ballet dancers
Royal Danish Ballet dancers
Danish countesses
19th-century Danish actresses
Frederick VII of Denmark